The Battle of Ciani was a battle fought in July 1015 during the German–Polish War, between the army the Holy Roman Empire led by Henry II against the forces of Duchy of Poland. It was fought near the gord of Ciani (now Zützen, Germany). It was won by the German forces.

History 
During the German–Polish War, while the army of the Holy Roman Empire led by Henry II has been attacked, while passing through Lusatia, by the forces of Duchy of Poland stationed in the gord of Ciani (now Zützen, a city quarter of Golßen, Germany), near which, the battle was fought. It was the first major battle of the war. It was won by the German side, with the Polish forces being completely destroyed.

Citations

References

Bibliography 
Stanisław Zakrzewski, Bolesław Chrobry Wielki.

Ciani
Ciani
Ciani
Ciani
10th century in Poland
10th century in Germany